CSI (Crime Scene Investigation) is a media franchise of American television series created by Anthony E. Zuiker. The first three CSI series follow the work of forensic scientists as they unveil the circumstances behind mysterious deaths, while the fourth series, CSI: Cyber, emphasizes behavioral psychology and how it can be applied to cyber forensics.

CSI: Crime Scene Investigation began on October 6, 2000, and ran for fifteen full seasons. Starring (at various times) William Petersen, Ted Danson, Marg Helgenberger, Elisabeth Shue, and Laurence Fishburne, the series concluded its run with a two-hour finale entitled "Immortality" on September 27, 2015. The series' original lead characters, Gil Grissom and Catherine Willows, were based upon Las Vegas Metropolitan Police Department (LVMPD) Crime Scene Analysts Daniel Holstein and Yolanda McClary. CSI first spin-off and the second series within the franchise is CSI: Miami, which ran for ten seasons between 2002 and 2012, and was canceled on May 13, 2012. Miami stars David Caruso and Emily Procter, with its lead character, Horatio Caine, based upon Los Angeles Police Department (LAPD) bomb squad technician Detective John Haynes.

In 2004, CSI: Miami spun off CSI: NY, the third series in the franchise and the only indirect spin-off of CSI. It was canceled on May 10, 2013, after nine seasons. The series starred Gary Sinise, Melina Kanakaredes, and Sela Ward. In 2014, CSI spun off CSI: Cyber, its second direct spin-off and the fourth series in the franchise. Cyber premiered in 2015, and starred Patricia Arquette and franchise alumnus Ted Danson—the only actor to appear as a series regular in more than one CSI series. The lead character, Avery Ryan, was inspired by cyber-psychologist Mary Aiken, who was attached to the series as a producer. CSI: Cyber was canceled on May 12, 2016.

In 2020, CBS began considering a limited series revival featuring original CSI: Crime Scene Investigation cast members, William Petersen and Jorja Fox. It was eventually greenlighted, with a video teaser for CSI: Vegas released on March 31, 2021.

Overview
The CSI franchise is available in 200 territories with an audience of two billion people. Various spin-offs have been developed to cater for the market including novels, comic books, and computer games.

The franchise has had a large cultural impact. It has spawned what has been called the "CSI effect", in which juries often have unreasonable expectations of real-life forensics because of what they have seen on CSI. Equally, the new-found popularity of forensics dramas on television has led to an increase in applications for courses dealing with forensic science or archaeological science—in the United Kingdom applications are up by 30%. The franchise is so influential that fellow CBS show How I Met Your Mother advertised itself as "not a Crime Scene Investigation show". In some ways the franchise may also fill a cultural need:

The "CSI effect" is considered by some experts to be responsible for helping criminals covering up evidence that could be used to trace them using techniques learned by watching CSI and other shows in the same genre. A 2018 study could not find conclusive evidence for the existence of this effect.

Series
CSI: Miami and CSI: Cyber spun off from CSI, and CSI: NY spun off from CSI: Miami, all via backdoor pilot episodes. CSI: Vegas was not launched via a backdoor pilot episode, and instead premiered 21 years to the day of CSI: Crime Scene Investigations launch.

Timeline
CSI: Miami and CSI: Cyber spun off from CSI, and CSI: NY spun off from CSI: Miami, all via backdoor-pilot episodes.

Characters

Differences between series

Las Vegas (CSI: Crime Scene Investigation and CSI: Vegas) 
The Las Vegas team are scientists foremost, and follow the evidence. LVPD CSIs are not employed as police officers. The crimes the Las Vegas CSI team face (other than the standard murders, attempted murders, kidnappings, and rapes) include casino robberies, bodies buried in the Nevada desert, and murders during different conventions at casinos.

Crime lab
The Las Vegas Metropolitan Police Department Crime Lab is a modern crime lab and shares a lot (but not a building) with the Las Vegas Police Department. It reports to the sheriff's office. In early episodes of season one the lab is frequently referred to as the number two crime lab in the United States, solving cases believed unsolvable. The lab consists of specialist laboratories, a larger office (usually used by the Grave Supervisor), a smaller office used by Catherine Willows between seasons 5 and 12, a locker room, an AV room, a break-room, and stairs leading to a second floor, housing offices for senior staff.

Miami (CSI: Miami)  
The Miami team are detectives foremost, and mainly use theories to solve crimes. The crimes the Miami CSI team face (other than the standard murders, attempted murders, kidnappings, and rapes) include drug running, murdered refugees from Cuba, bodies found washed up on the beach and dumped in the Everglades, and crimes involving the rich and famous who have secrets to hide in their mansions and beachfront properties.

Crime lab
The Miami CSIs were firstly, in the backdoor pilot, stationed out of a broom closet next to the MDPD's bull pen. They were given their own building prior to the start of the first season. Originally dark and technical, this building housed Horatio's office, Megan's office, specialist labs, and a locker room. During the fourth season a government grant meant that slanted glass walls, multiple modern labs, an interrogation room, and a new locker room were all constructed. Horatio's office is not seen following the lab's reconstruction—although a state-of-the-art ballistics suite was added, acting as Calleigh's office. The lab has reinforced windows and shutters to protect against hurricanes and tsunamis.

Manhattan (CSI: NY) 
The New York team are equally scientists and detectives, and frequently use criminal profiling (as well as evidence and theories) to solve cases. The crimes the New York CSI team face (other than the standard murders, attempted murders, kidnappings, and rapes) include organized crime activity involving the Italian Mafia, street-gang violence, and ethnic, cultural, and ability differences.

Crime lab
During the first season, the NYPD CSI lab is in an old underground building with rustic brick walls. The lab houses Mac's office, a locker room, the autopsy suite, and specialist forensic laboratories. As of the second season the lab is on the 35th floor of a high-rise building in Manhattan. Equipped with glass walls and state-of-the-art equipment, this lab consists of the Supervisor’s office (belonging to Mac, and – for a short time – Jo), specialist laboratories, an observation walkway, a break-room and kitchen, a locker room, and an office belonging to the Assistant Supervisor (first Stella, then Jo), containing an additional hot-desk used by Hawkes, Danny, Lindsay, and Aiden. Part of this second lab is blown up in the season three finale, "Snow Day", but is restored by the beginning of season four.

Washington, D.C. (CSI: Cyber) 
The Cyber team focuses on the technical aspect of crimes, with NextGen forensics providing it with a real-world crime scene investigative counterpart. The FBI Cyber Crime Division investigates cyber-based terrorism, internet-related murders, espionage, computer intrusions, major cyber-fraud, cyber-theft, hacking, sex offenses, blackmail, and any other crime deemed to be cyber-related within the FBI's jurisdiction.

Divisions
— Cyber Crime DivisionThe FBI Cyber Crime Division operates out of Washington, D.C. and is housed in the Cyber Threat Operations Center. The CTOC consists of Ryan's office, Russell's office, a communications bull pen housing the desks of Krumitz, Nelson, and Ramirez, a cyber lab, a glass walkway, and a 'tear-down room'. Due to their nomadic nature the team are often seen interviewing suspects at various FBI field offices and police departments.

— Next Generation Cyber Forensics DivisionThe Next Generation Cyber Forensics Division is a lab-based facility within the Cyber Crime Division used for the processing of evidence in cyber-related cases.

Theme songs
The opening themes for all five series are remixes of songs performed by The Who.

Crossovers
Crossovers are possible between CSI series as well as with other programs within the same creative stable. Between the series the baton is passed to the new CSI series via a crossover/pilot where cases are overlapped and personnel are shared. Many actors have appeared in two of the series. Five actors have appeared in three: David Caruso, Laurence Fishburne, and Gary Sinise all appeared in CSI, CSI: Miami, and CSI: NY, while Ted Danson appeared as a guest star on CSI: NY and a series regular on both CSI and CSI: Cyber, making him the first actor to be a main character in more than one CSI series. Before becoming a regular as "Danny Messer" on CSI: NY, Carmine Giovinazzo had a small role as "Thumpy G" in an episode of CSI, making him the only lead actor to play two characters within the franchise.  Crossovers have also, on occasion, taken place between a CSI series and a series outside the franchise.

Within the franchise

With other series

UK TV movies
In the UK, Channel 5 edited together related episodes to make one whole feature. These include:

Also Channel 5 will sometimes group episodes with similar themes together such as:
 Psychopaths called "CSI: Psycho Season" – episodes involve characters such as Paul Millander, Nate Haskell (The Dick & Jane Killer), and Charlie DiMasa (Dr. Jekyll) from CSI; Antonio Riaz, Walter Resden, and Clavo Cruz from CSI: Miami; and Shane Casey, Clay Dobson, Hollis Eckhart (The Compass Killer), and The Cabbie Killer from CSI: NY.
 Home Invasion Murders – episodes include "Blood Drops" and "Gum Drops" from CSI, "Slaughterhouse" from CSI: Miami, and "Damned If You Do" and "Who's There?" from CSI: NY.
 Cop killings called "CSI: Cops in Crisis" – episodes include "Cop Killer" from CSI: Miami as well as the episodes where regular CSI characters are killed such as Warrick Brown, Tim Speedle, Aiden Burn, and Jessica Angell.
 Domestic murders between couples called "CSI: Murder and Matrimony" – episodes include "Just Murdered" and "Divorce Party" from CSI: Miami.
 Guest celebrities called "CSI: Celeb" including the episodes featuring Justin Bieber, Taylor Swift and Kim Kardashian among others.
 Christmas themed episodes called "A CSI Christmas" – episodes include "The Lost Reindeer" from CSI and "Silent Night", "Forbidden Fruit", "Second Chances" and "Shop Till You Drop" from CSI: NY.  Also Channel 5 might include Christmas themed episodes from other crime dramas such as the NCIS franchise, The Mentalist and Castle.

Other media

Comics

There have been a number of comic books based on all three series published by IDW Publishing. Writers include Jeff Mariotte and Max Allan Collins.

Games
The CSI franchise has spawned 12 computer games published by Ubisoft across the three shows. Nine for CSI: Crime Scene Investigation: CSI: Crime Scene Investigation–2003, CSI: Dark Motives–2004, CSI: 3 Dimensions of Murder–2006, CSI: Hard Evidence–2007, CSI: Deadly Intent–2009, CSI: Fatal Conspiracy–2010, CSI: Unsolved–2010, CSI: Crime City–2010, and CSI: Hidden Crimes–2014. Two for CSI: Miami: CSI: Miami–2004 and CSI: Miami – Heat Wave–2012. One for CSI: NY: CSI: NY – The Game–2008.

Gameloft has also published a series of mobile games based on the CSI series including CSI: The Mobile Game (Vegas) and CSI: Miami.

In addition, several board games and puzzles based on all three series have seen release, all published by Canadian game manufacturer Specialty Board Games, Inc. In 2011, the CSI Board Game was released by another Canadian company, GDC–GameDevCo Ltd. It is the first game to include all three CSI shows.

A pinball game machine called CSI: Crime Scene Investigation was released in 2008.

Exhibition

Chicago's Museum of Science & Industry opened an exhibit in CSIs honor on May 25, 2007 called: "CSI: The Experience". In October 2011 it was at Discovery Times Square in New York City. There is also a game on the website where you are trained in forensic biology, weapons and tool mark analyses, toxicology and the autopsy.

Novels

Various tie-in novels have appeared based on the series. Authors include Max Allan Collins (CSI: Crime Scene Investigation), Donn Cortez (CSI: Miami), Stuart M. Kaminsky (CSI: NY), and Keith R.A. DeCandido (CSI: NY).

Magazine
Titan Magazines published 11 issues of CSI Magazine starting in November 2007. They contained a mixture of features and interviews looking into the world of the three CSIs and the people who help create it. They were available in the UK and US.

Toys
A range of toys have been developed. These include:
 "CSI: Forensics Lab"
 "CSI: DNA Laboratory"
 "CSI: Forensic Facial"
However, they have been the source of some controversy. The Parents Television Council, who have complained about CSI in general, in 2004 released a statement specifically aimed at the toys. The PTC e-mailed letters to their supporters, telling them the content of the games were entirely inappropriate for children to be exposed to "because the CSI franchise often displays graphic images, including close-ups of corpses with gunshot wounds and other bloody injuries." The letter went on to say "The PTC doesn't think the recreation of blood, guts and gore should be under a child's Christmas tree this year," PTC concluded. "This so-called 'toy' is a blatant attempt to market CSI and its adult-oriented content directly to children."

In urging members to file a complaint with the Federal Trade Commission, PTC said CBS parent company Viacom needed to hear from parents who are concerned about the "graphic scenes of blood, violence, and sex" in their product. They also asked their supporters to contact Target and Toys "R" Us.

World record
Producers announced intentions to break the Guinness World Record for largest ever TV simulcast drama on March 4, 2015, with the episode "Kitty" airing in 150 countries in addition to digital streaming. They succeeded in breaking the record by airing CSI: Cybers backdoor pilot in 171 countries.

Documentaries
Because of the popularity of the CSI franchise in the United Kingdom, Channel 5 created two documentaries about CSI. The first one called The Real CSI follows real crime scene investigators as they work on crime scene. The second documentary, True CSI, features true tales of how forensic science has helped solve some of the world's best known crimes. True CSI had actors re-enacting the crime as well as interviews with people involved in the solving of the crimes themselves. Cases featured included the Sam Sheppard case.

In early 2007, British channel ITV1 broadcast a special of its flagship documentary Tonight with Trevor McDonald discussing the ramifications of the "CSI effect", highlighting the effect of not only the franchise but also several other British and American TV police procedurals.

The popularity of the series has also spawned forensic based reality television/documentary programs, including A&E's The First 48 and truTV's North Mission Road.

In April 2012, PBS' Frontline aired a documentary called "The Real CSI" investigating the limitations of the CSI techniques in forensic science.

References

Further reading 
As well as fictional books based on the franchise there have also been a number of guides published:
 Flaherty, Mike, and Corinne Marrinan (September 2004). CSI: Crime Scene Investigation Companion. Pocket Books, .
 Marrinan, Corinne, and Steve Parker (October 2006). Ultimate CSI: Crime Scene Investigation. Dorling Kindersley, .
 Cortez, Donn, and Leah Wilson, eds. (December 2006). Investigating CSI: An Unauthorized Look Inside the Crime Labs of Las Vegas, Miami, and New York. Smart Pop series, BenBella Books, .
 Allen, Michael (August 2007). Reading CSI: Crime TV Under the Microscope. I.B. Tauris, .
 Cohan, Steven (December 2008). CSI: Crime Scene Investigation. BFI TV Classics, BFI Publishing, .

 
Mass media franchises introduced in 2000
American police procedural television series
Mass media franchises
Television franchises
Paramount Global franchises